Mainz Römisches Theater station is a station in the city of Mainz, the capital of the German state of Rhineland-Palatinate on the Main Railway from Mainz to Frankfurt am Main. It is the most important station in the city after Mainz Hauptbahnhof. It is classified by Deutsche Bahn as a category 3 station. The station is served by S-Bahn and regional trains.

History 
Mainz Römisches (Roman) Theater is the third name of this station. Until the timetable change in December 2006, it was called Mainz Süd. It was opened as Mainz-Neuthor station on the Rhine-Main Railway from Mainz to Darmstadt and Aschaffenburg. The railway between Mainz and Darmstadt was opened on 1 August 1858 and used a train ferry to cross the Rhine until 1862 when the South Bridge was put into service. The Mainz-Ludwigshafen line opened later. In 1884 a bypass of central Mainz was opened along with Mainz Hauptbahnhof with its southern end near the original Mainz-Neuthor station.

Entrance building and its facilities 

A new station building was opened in 1884 on the north side of the platforms, but it was largely demolished in 2006. It was a brick building, designed by Johann Philipp Berdellé. The ground floor had Rundbogenstil rounded portals that continued into the windows of the lower eastern arcade. The main building had two storeys, with rectangular windows of bunter sandstone in a renaissance revival style. After the redesign and construction of commercial buildings at the station, only the listed facade of the old building has been preserved near the rail tracks. This facade has been integrated into the new building.

The station retains the historic cast iron columns with fluted shafts and composite capitals of the platform roof, which were built in a neoclassical style in 1861 and which had probably been previously used at the old Hessian Ludwig Railway station in Darmstadt. They were refurbished  in the spring of 2008. However, the overall redevelopment of the station itself has still not started. The renovation work at the station will cost around €1 million.

Directly above the station is the citadel. The Neutor barracks were built in 1866 directly below the station to defend the railway from a possible French invasion. Both buildings had to be bypassed.

The name of the station used since December 2006 is derived from the adjacent ruins of a former Roman theatre. The platform of track 4 crosses the stage area of the ancient theatre. During construction of the railway line through this ground no thought was given to protecting this monument. The retaining wall of the 19th century railway has been partially removed in recent years, enabling the excavation of the theatre.

Rail operations 

The station has three platforms on four tracks. The tracks towards Mainz Hauptbahnhof enter the Mainz railway tunnel immediately west of the station under the Eisgrub.

From here, three routes are operated to the southeast:
the Rhine-Main Railway (to Darmstadt and Aschaffenburg, operated by the Regionalbahn RB 75 service)
The Main Railway (to Frankfurt, Offenbach (Main) Ost and Hanau Hauptbahnhof, operated by line S 8 of the Rhine-Main S-Bahn)
the Mainz–Ludwigshafen–Mannheim line

Trains run to the northwest to Mainz Hauptbahnhof, Wiesbaden Hauptbahnhof, Koblenz Hauptbahnhof and to Saarbrücken Hauptbahnhof.

Tracks 2, 3 and 4 are not yet adapted for access for the disabled. A lift from the listed pedestrian underpass only currently exists to the platform for track 1.

Regional and S-Bahn services

Regional rail services are as follows:

The places written small are not served regularly.

Buses
The station is connected by the Mainz public transport network through two nearby bus stops:
 Bahnhof Römisches Theater/CineStar: lines 64, 65, 66E, 67E, 71, 92
 Zitadellenweg/Bahnhof Römisches Theater: lines 64, 65, 66E, 67E, 90, 92.

There are direct connections to Mainz Hauptbahnhof (lines 64, 65, 71, 90, 92) and to the centre of Mainz (lines 64, 65, 66E, 67E, 71, 90, 92).

References

Rhine-Main S-Bahn stations
Romisches Theater
Railway stations in Germany opened in 1884